Golborne railway station may refer to the following stations in the English town of Golborne:

 Golborne South railway station, on the West Coast Main Line, open from 1839 to 1967, and known as Golborne until 1949.
 Golborne North railway station, on the Liverpool, St Helens and South Lancashire Railway, open from 1895 to 1952, also known as Golborne until 1949.